The 2009 Senegalese League Cup (Coupe de la Ligue) was the first ever edition of the League Cup challenge.  The format is like a playoff system and features clubs from the country's top two leagues (Ligue 1 and 2).  AS Douanes won the first title. Five rounds were featured and 30 clubs competed.  The winner competes into the Assemblée Nationale Cup or the National Assembly Cup, the super cup competition in Senegal.

First round or 1/16 final

1/4 final
Entrants:
ASC Linguère
Casa Sports

Quarterfinal

Semifinal

Final
No first ever final match occurred in the edition as the match was forfeited by Casa Sports as some players did not qualify.  AS Douanes won their first ever title of the League Cup.

External links
the 2009 Senegalese League Cup (Coupe de la Ligue) at RSSSF.com

Football in Senegal

2009 in African association football leagues
2008–09 in Senegalese football